The Typhoon class, Soviet designation Project 941 Akula, is a class of nuclear-powered ballistic missile submarines designed and built by the Soviet Union for the Soviet Navy. With a submerged displacement of 48,000 tonnes, the Typhoons are the largest submarines ever built, able to accommodate comfortable living facilities for the crew of 160 when submerged for months on end. The source of the NATO reporting name remains unclear, although it is often claimed to be related to the use of the word "typhoon" ("тайфун") by General Secretary Leonid Brezhnev of the Communist Party in a 1974 speech while describing a new type of nuclear ballistic missile submarine, as a reaction to the United States Navy's new .

The Russian Navy cancelled its Typhoon modernization program in March 2012, stating that modernizing one Typhoon would be as expensive as building two new s. With the announcement that Russia has eliminated the last R-39 Rif (SS-N-20 Sturgeon) SLBMs in September 2012, only one Typhoon remained in service, which was armed with the more modern RSM-56 Bulava SLBM. Dmitriy Donskoi was decommissioned in February 2023.

Description

K stands for Cruiser: . The sheer displacement of the Typhoon-class boats, comparable to several aircraft carrier classes, led to their classification as Heavy Cruisers; .

Besides their missile armament, the Typhoon class featured six torpedo tubes designed to handle RPK-2 (SS-N-15) missiles or Type 53 torpedoes. A Typhoon-class submarine could stay submerged for 120 days in normal conditions, and potentially more if deemed necessary (e.g., in the case of a nuclear war). Their primary weapons system was composed of 20 R-39 (NATO: SS-N-20) ballistic missiles (SLBM) with a maximum of 10 MIRV nuclear warheads each. Technically, Typhoons were able to deploy their long-range nuclear missiles while moored at their docks.

Typhoon-class submarines featured multiple pressure hulls which simplifies internal design while making the vessel much wider than a normal submarine. In the main body of the sub, two long pressure hulls lie parallel with a third, smaller pressure hull above them (which protrudes just below the sail), and two other pressure hulls for torpedoes and steering gear. This also greatly increases their survivability – even if one pressure hull is breached, the crew members in the other are safe and there is less potential for flooding. Its ballistic missiles were placed between the two main pressure hulls, their launch tubes enclosed only by the outer, "light" hull.

The Typhoon was capable of traveling at  submerged.

History

The Typhoon class was developed under Project 941 as the Soviet Akula class (Акула), meaning shark. It is sometimes confused with other submarines, as Akula is the name NATO uses to designate the Russian Project 971 Shchuka-B (Щука-Б)-class attack submarines. The project was developed with the objective to match the SLBM armament of s, capable of carrying 192 nuclear warheads, 100 kt each, but with significantly longer range. To accommodate this increase in range, Soviet SLBMs were substantially larger and heavier than their American counterparts (the R-39 Rif is more than twice as heavy as the UGM-96 Trident I; it remains the heaviest SLBM to have been in service worldwide). The submarine had to be scaled accordingly.

In the early 1990s, there were also proposals to refit some of the Typhoon-class submarines to submarine cargo vessels for shipping oil, gas and cargo under polar ice to Russia's far flung northern territories. The submarines could take up to 10,000 tonnes of cargo on-board and ship it under the polar ice to tankers waiting in the Barents Sea. These ships – after the considerable engineering required to develop technologies to transfer oil from drilling platforms to the submarines, and later, to the waiting tankers – would then deliver their cargo world-wide.

Six Typhoon-class submarines were built between 1976 and 1985. Originally, the submarines were designated by hull numbers only. Names were later assigned to the four vessels retained by the Russian Navy after the dissolution of the Soviet Union. During the time of the Russian Federation, these boats were to be sponsored by either a city or company. The construction order for an additional vessel (hull number TK-210) was cancelled and never completed. 

In late December 2008, a senior Navy official announced that the two Typhoon-class submarines, TK-17 Arkhangelsk and TK-20 Severstal, that were in reserve would not be rearmed with the new Bulava SLBM missile system. They could potentially yet be modified to carry cruise missiles or to lay mines, or could be used in special operations. In late June 2009, the Navy Commander-in-Chief, Admiral Vladimir Vysotskiy, told reporters that the two submarines would be reserved for possible future repairs and modernisation. In September 2011, the Russian defense ministry decided to write off all Project 941 Akula nuclear-powered ballistic missile submarines until 2014. The reasons for decommissioning the Typhoon-class vessels are the restrictions imposed on Russia by the Strategic Arms Reduction Treaty and successful trials of new Borei-class submarine.

Despite being a replacement for many types of submarines, the Borei-class submarines are slightly shorter than the Typhoon class ( as opposed to ), and have a smaller crew (107 people as opposed to 160). These changes were in part designed to reduce the cost to build and maintain the submarines. In addition, the United States and Canada provided 80% of funds for scrapping the older Typhoon-class submarines, making it much more economical to build a new submarine.

In 2013, the state-run RIA Novosti news agency announced that the Navy would scrap two Typhoons, beginning in 2018. They were the TK-17 Arkhangelsk and TK-20 Severstal. As of 2017, the decision about the scrapping of TK-17 and TK-20 was still not firm.

On 20 July 2022, it was reported that Dmitriy Donskoy was withdrawn from the Russian Navy. This was an earlier-than-expected decommission date, as it was stated in 2021 that the submarine was expected to remain in service until 2026 as a weapons test platform. However sources suggested in 2022 that the 2026 date was not in the Russian Navy plan.
On 6 February 2023, it was reported she was decommissioned.

Units

Timeline

TK-208 Dmitriy Donskoy (Typhoon #1)
 10 February 1982: Entered 18th division (Zapadnaya Litsa), NOR.
 December 1982: Transferred from Severodvinsk to Zapadnaya Litsa.
 1983-1984: Tests of D-19 missile complex. Commanders: A.V.Olkhovikov (1980–1984).
 3 December 1986: Entered Navy Board of the Winners of the Socialist Competition.
 18 January 1987: Entered MoD Board of Glory.
 20 September 1989 – 1991: Repairs and refit at Sevmash to Project 941U. 1991 refit cancelled.
 1996: Returned to 941U refit.
 2002: Named Dmitriy Donskoy.
 26 June 2002: End of refit.
 30 June 2002: Start of testing.
 26 July 2002: Entered sea trials, re-entered fleet, without missile system.
 December 2003: Sea trials; refitted to carry a new Bulava missile system. New missile system expected to be operational by 2005.
 9 October 2005: Successfully launched SS-NX-30 Bulava SLBM from surface.
 21 December 2005: Successfully launched SS-NX-30 Bulava SLBM from submerged position on move.
 7 September 2006: Test launch of the Bulava missile failed after several minutes in flight due to some problems in the flight control system. The missile fell into the sea about a minute after the launch. The sub was not affected and was returning to Severodvinsk base submerged. Later reports blamed the engine of the first stage for the failure.
 25 October 2006: Test launch of the Bulava-M missile in the White Sea failed some 200 seconds after liftoff due to the apparent failure of the flight control system.
 28 August 2008: Underwent successful testing at the Sevmash shipyard in Severodvinsk, Arkhangelsk Oblast. More than 170 men worked with the Dmitriy Donskoy, 100 of them employed at the Sevmash plant and 70 at other companies.
 20 July 2022: Decommissioned

TK-17 Arkhangelsk (Typhoon #5)
 19 February 1988: Entered 18th division (Zapadnaya Litsa) NOR.
 September 1991, damaged after a SLBM exploded in the launch silo.
 8 January–9 November 2002: Refit at Sevmash.
 In July 2002, crew petitioned Main Navy Headquarters to adopt the name Arkhangel'sk (renamed on 18 November 2002).
 Commander: 2002-2003 V. Volkov.
 17 February 2004: Took part in military exercises with President Vladimir Putin aboard.
 Decommissioned in 2006 and preserved. The decision about its dismantling still has not been made. Apparent proposal to convert to cruise missile role being considered in 2019 but deemed unlikely.

TK-20 Severstal (Typhoon #6)
 28 February 1990: Entered 18th division (Zapadnaya Litsa), NOR.
 25 August 1996: Successfully launched SLBM
 November 1996: Successfully launched SLBM from the North Pole.
 24 July 1999: Took part in parade on Navy Day in Severomorsk, NOR.
 November–December 1999 – distant cruise.
 2001: named to Severstal.
 June 2001–December 2002: Repairs at Sevmash.
 Commander: A. Bogachev (2001).
 Decommissioned in 2004 or 2013 and preserved. The decision about its dismantling still has not been made. Apparent proposal to convert to cruise missile role being considered in 2019 but deemed unlikely.

Notable appearances in media

Probably the best-known fictional Typhoon-class submarine is the stealth-equipped Red October (Ru:Красный Oктябрь), the subject of the Tom Clancy novel The Hunt for Red October and its 1990 movie adaptation, starring Sean Connery as the fictional Captain Marko Ramius.

The 2001 documentary Mission Invisible about the Russian submarine Severstal was produced by Corona Films for Discovery Channel with the participation of ZED, France 5, ZDF, RTBF, TV5 Monde and the Scottish Screen Fund.

In 2008 National Geographic released a documentary about the scrapping of one of the Typhoons in the series Break It Down. This boat is TK-13, which was scrapped in 2007–2009.

See also
 List of Soviet and Russian submarine classes
 List of submarine classes in service
 Future of the Russian Navy
 Submarine-launched ballistic missile

References

External links

 
Submarine classes
Russian and Soviet navy submarine classes
Cold War submarines of the Soviet Union
Soviet inventions
Nuclear submarines of the Soviet Navy